Matthew John Derrick-Huie (born September 29, 1994), better known by his stage name John River, is a Canadian rapper, songwriter, and activist. Since 2012, River has released several music videos and two mixtapes—The Calm and The Storm. The music video for his song "Hope City II" went viral online, and was subsequently nominated for a Much Music Video Award for Best Hip Hop Music Video at the 2015 Much Music Video Awards. His music has been featured in the web series Teenagers.

Early life 
River was born and raised in Mississauga, a city within the Greater Toronto Area. He attended Clarkson Secondary School, where he began writing songs and participating in rap battles that took place in the school's stairwells. River did not graduate from high school, instead opting to drop out and focus on pursuing a career in the music industry. River also spent some time in France and Italy, where he trained to become a professional soccer player before concentrating on music.

Career

2012–2014: First mixtape 
River released his first mixtape, The Calm, in 2012, at the age of 18; it received positive reviews from music critics. HipHopCanada wrote that the track "Every Evening", "nicely showcased [River's] ability to tell a story, deliver a message and be mindful of keeping the music catchy." Chris Dart of the Torontoist called The Calm a "big, ambitious, high-concept project," concluding that "in an era where rappers are afraid to tackle issues, River doesn’t shy away from talking about things like gun violence, the justice system, and teenage pregnancy."

2015–2016: Second mixtape 
In January 2015, River released a music video for his song "Hope City II", which has, as of 2017, amassed over 982,000 hits on YouTube. The music video for "Hope City II" was nominated for a Much Music Video Award for Best Hip Hop Music Video, ultimately losing out to Drake's viral video for "Hotline Bling". That summer, River's song "BLVD", dedicated to fellow rapper Redway, who was killed in a shooting, was chosen by NOW Magazine as one of Toronto's "songs of the summer." Both "Hope City II" and "BLVD" were featured on River's second mixtape, The Storm, which was released in 2015.

Upon release, The Storm received positive reviews; Erin Lowers from Exclaim! wrote that River is "secure enough with himself to be vulnerable, to make mistakes and express emotions," further noting that "The Storm demonstrates the growing pains of modern day rap — balancing the ability to be lyrically aggressive without being heartless..." The mixtape featured production from Wondagurl. In support of the mixtape, River embarked on a college and university tour in late 2015.

In June 2015, River sampled the James Arthur song "Get Down", with altered rap lyrics and verses. A music video for River's version was shot in Mississauga, Ontario, Canada and was directed by Abstrakte and produced by MadRuk Ent. River's version of the track was featured prominently in the second season of the web series Teenagers, which was written and directed by M. H. Murray, who attended Clarkson Secondary School with River.

In June 2016, River's music video concept for his song "Pray For Me" was selected by Bell Media's MuchFACT for funding. In February 2016, XXL named him as one of top ten artists to watch from Canada.

2017–present: Musical hiatus and subsequent return 
Throughout most of 2017, River struggled with a series of medical issues, and as a result, he did not release any music. On September 14, 2018, River ended his musical hiatus with the surprise release of a song titled "Burn the Boats". Lyrically, the song focuses on River's journey "back from the dead" after undergoing surgeries due to intracranial hypotension and other medical complications.

Artistry 
River has been called a "conscious rapper" on several occasions. In 2016, XXL praised him for being "fearlessly earnest," and described his music as "a touch of J. Cole for his introspective lyrics and flow delivered over solid, stadium-ready beats".

Personal life

Health issues 
Since late 2017, River has suffered from serious health issues. In a series of tweets, in January 2018, River explained that he was struggling with "mysterious chest pains, breathing problems, temporary blindness, depressive episodes and an unending stream of diagnostic dead ends". Medical staff at the hospital reportedly failed to diagnose him with any illnesses related to these symptoms. In February 2018, a neurologist diagnosed River with intracranial hypotension as well as paraspinal pain, severe anemia, and a dislocated jaw joint. His intracranial hypotension had caused his brain to "sag for many weeks". In April 2018, River's family revealed that he had undergone a pair of surgeries to fix a brain fluid leak. River announced his recovery and return to music in an Instagram post on August 7, 2018.

Activism 
River often speaks out regarding various social justice issues, most notably voicing support for Black Lives Matter and taking part in various protests in support of the movement. At the 2015 Much Music Video Awards, River walked the red carpet wearing a shirt that said "Black Lives Matter" in large, block letters across the front. The Huffington Post called River's shirt "a bold statement." The following year, at the 2016 ceremony, River attracted media attention when he wore a shirt that said "Stop Blaming Muslims" on it.

River is also a supporter of gender equality and the LGBT community.

Accolades

Discography

Mixtapes
2012: The Calm 
2015: The Storm
2019: The Academy

Music videos
2015: "Hope City II"
2015: "Get Down"
2015: "The Storm"
2016: "Pray for Me"
2019: "Before I Go"

References 

Canadian male rappers
21st-century Canadian rappers
Living people
1994 births
Black Canadian musicians
Musicians from Mississauga
21st-century Canadian male musicians